Jonica "Jojo" T. Gibbs is an American actress and comedian. She plays the lead role of Hattie on the BET series Twenties.

Early life and education 
Gibbs was born in South Carolina and raised by her great-grandparents in Hampstead, North Carolina. She received her bachelor's degree in journalism from University of North Carolina at Chapel Hill. Negative experiences with faculty members in the department discouraged her from pursuing journalism. After graduation, she worked several jobs, including as a substitute teacher, and acted in student films at SCAD.

Career 
Gibbs moved to Los Angeles in 2015 to pursue acting professionally, a year after she began stand-up comedy. She and her close friend Rashonda Joplin started a production company and developed the web series No More Comics in L.A. They shot and financed two episodes and created a crowdfunding campaign to raise money for the remaining eight episodes. They reached out to a number of Black television creatives to market the campaign, including Lena Waithe.

Waithe invited Gibbs to audition for Twenties, which was her first audition. Gibbs was cast in the lead role as Hattie, a broke, queer, aspiring TV writer loosely based on Waithe's experiences. Gibbs has spoken about the significance of playing one of few masculine-of-center lesbians in American media.

Gibbs has a recurring role in Good Trouble and the scripted podcast The Left Right Game. Gibbs starred in the 2022 thriller Fresh.

Personal life 
Gibbs is openly gay. She came out to her mother at 19 after watching True Life: I'm Coming Out.

Filmography

Television

Film

References

External links 
 
 Jonica T. Gibbs on Instagram

Year of birth missing (living people)
Living people
21st-century American actresses
African-American actresses
LGBT African Americans
American lesbian actresses
UNC Hussman School of Journalism and Media alumni
Entertainers from North Carolina
American television actresses
African-American television producers
African-American stand-up comedians
American stand-up comedians
LGBT people from South Carolina
LGBT people from North Carolina
African-American female comedians
American women comedians
21st-century African-American women
21st-century African-American people
Lesbian comedians
American LGBT comedians